The Philippine men's national under-20 ice hockey team is the national under-20 ice hockey team of the Philippines. The team is controlled by the Federation of Ice Hockey League (FIHL), an associate member of the International Ice Hockey Federation (IIHF). The team have not entered in any IIHF World U20 Championship.

History
The first IIHF-sanctioned event the Philippine junior team participated in was the 2018 IIHF U20 Challenge Cup of Asia which was held in Kuala Lumpur, Malaysia in December 2017. The hosts Malaysia won the gold while the Philippines finished fourth in the tournament contested by five national teams winning only over last-placers India. Filipino player, Benjamin Jorge Imperial was named Best Defenceman at the end of the tournament who is also the best non-Malaysian scorer with six goals and four assisting. The team's head coach was Steven Füglister. In the second edition, also hosted by Malaysia, the Philippines placed third place besting only the United Arab Emirates in the four-team competition. Jaiden Mackale Roxas was selected as the tournament's Best Goaltender.

International competitions

U20 Challenge Cup of Asia

All-time record against other nations
Last match update: 8 December 2018

See also
Philippines men's national ice hockey team
Philippines women's national ice hockey team

References

External links
Hockey Philippines
National Teams of Ice Hockey

Ice hockey in the Philippines
Junior national ice hockey teams
Ice hockey